Mohammad Ghasem Poursattar was an Iranian actor. was born in Ardabil, Iran in 1939.

He is best known for his roles in Prophet Joseph, Saint Mary, The Messiah, and The Men of Angelos.

Filmography

1939 births
2017 deaths
Iranian male film actors
Iranian male television actors
Male actors from Tehran
People from Ardabil